Every Mother's Nightmare (EMN) is an American hard rock/hair metal band from Memphis, Tennessee, United States.

Career

Every Mother's Nightmare formed in 1987 in Memphis and were signed by Clive Davis to Arista Records.  After signing with Arista, their videos for “Walls Came Down,” “Love Can Make You Blind,” and “House of Pain” appeared on MTV's Headbangers Ball.
 
In the early 1990s, EMN opened for Cheap Trick and Dream Theater, were featured in Hard Rock magazines, and appeared on The Joan Rivers Show.

Two-time Academy Award nominee Michael Shannon can be seen in the music video for the song "House of Pain" which was featured on the band's second album.

In 2015, they released the "Grind" EP, which included guest appearances by Zach Myers of Shinedown, and Wayne Swinny of Saliva.

In 2017, Every Mother's Nightmare released the Grind album, which included guest appearances by Myers and Swinny, and they also released three videos.

In 2018, they reissued Smokin' Delta Voodoo which included bonus tracks. Smokin' Delta Voodoo was remastered by Anthony Focx.

In 2019, they reissued Backtraxx which also contained bonus tracks from the recording sessions. Backtraxx was remastered by Bill Chavis for HighVolMusic.

Discography

Studio albums
1990 - Every Mother's Nightmare  (Arista) Released on April 10, 1990
1993 - Wake Up Screaming  (Arista) Released on January 12, 1993
2000 - Smokin Delta Voodoo  (Perris) Released on November 14, 2000
2001 - Back Traxx  (Perris) Released on July 24, 2001
2002 - Deeper Shade of Grey  (Perris) Released on February 12, 2002
2015 - Grind - EP  (EMN Records) Released on June 19, 2015
2017 - Grind - Full Length  (HighVolMusic) Released on October 6, 2017
2018 - Smokin' Delta Voodoo - Reissue (HighVolMusic) Released on June 8, 2018
2019 - Grind - Vinyl (HighVolMusic) 
2019 - Backtraxx - Reissue (HighVolMusic)
2020 - Resurrect The Faithful (HighVolMusic)

Live albums
2002 - Live Songs from Somewhere  (Perris) Released on December 3, 2002

Singles
1990 - "Walls Come Down" (Arista)
1990 - "Love Can Make You Blind"  (Arista)
1993 - "House of Pain" (Arista)
2017 - "Loco Crazy" (HighVolMusic)
2018 - "Blown Away" (HighVolMusic)
2018 - "Delta Voodoo" (HighVolMusic)
2019 - "Southern Way" (HighVolMusic)
2020 - "Breathe" (HighVolMusic)

Current members
Rick Ruhl - Vocals
John Guttery - Lead Guitar
Troy Fleming - Bass
Allan Bone - Drums
Travis Butler - Lead Guitar

Original members
Rick Ruhl - Lead singer
Steve Malone/James Crawford - Guitar
Ronnie Cantrell/Mark McMurtry - Bass
Troy Bryan/Jim Phipps - Drums

Charts

Albums
1990  Every Mother's Nightmare,  Billboard 200 No. 146
1993  Wake Up Screaming,  Billboard Heatseekers No. 37
Singles
1990 "Love Can Make You Blind",  Mainstream Rock Tracks No. 22
2017 "Loco Crazy",  NACC/Metal Contraband Tracks No. 3
2018 "Loco Crazy",  Mediabase Tracks No. 71

See also
List of glam metal bands and artists

References

1987 establishments in Tennessee
Glam metal musical groups from Tennessee
Hard rock musical groups from Tennessee
Heavy metal musical groups from Tennessee
Musical groups established in 1987
Musical groups from Nashville, Tennessee